Le Locle Le Chalet railway station, also known as Le Chalet NE, is a railway station in the municipality of Le Locle, in the Swiss canton of Neuchâtel. It is located on the  Le Locle–Les Brenets line of the Transports publics Neuchâtelois.

Services 
 the following services stop at Le Locle Le Chalet:

References

External links 
 

Railway stations in the canton of Neuchâtel
Transports publics Neuchâtelois stations